The First Seven Years is a 1930 Our Gang short comedy film directed by Robert F. McGowan. It was the 96th (eighth talking) Our Gang short that was released.

Plot
Jackie is in love with Mary Ann, but she is not interested in any boy. Speck also is in love with Mary Ann. Mary Ann, after beating up Jackie (who got aggressive after seeking advice from Kennedy the Cop), decides to play along. She suggests that Jackie and Speck fight in a duel. Jackie tries to chicken out but winds up fighting Speck. They both use real swords that damaged a tire and the radiator leaked from an old car, and cut up tons of laundry on the clothes lines. The rest of the gang roots for Jackie. In the end, they drop their swords and fight with their fists. Jackie wins and Speck's father comes out and holds Jackie down and has Speck hit Jackie until Jackie's elderly grandmother steps in and knocks Speck and his dad out. The gang then cheers her on.

Cast

The Gang
 Jackie Cooper as Jackie
 Norman Chaney as Chubby
 Allen Hoskins as Farina
 Bobby Hutchins as Wheezer
 Mary Ann Jackson as Mary Ann
 Donald Haines as Speck
 Pete the Pup as Himself

Additional cast
 Otto Fries as Speck's father
 Edgar Kennedy as Kennedy the Cop
 Emma Reed as Farina's mother
 Joy Winthrop as Granny

See also
 Our Gang filmography

References

External links

1930 films
American black-and-white films
Films directed by Robert F. McGowan
Hal Roach Studios short films
1930 comedy films
Our Gang films
1930s American films